Abbie Cornish (born 7 August 1982) is an Australian actress. Cornish is best known for her film roles as Heidi in Somersault (2004), Fanny Brawne in Bright Star (2009), Sweet Pea in Sucker Punch (2011), Lindy in Limitless (2011), Clara Murphy in RoboCop (2014), as Sarah in Geostorm (2017) and for her work with writer/director Martin McDonagh in Seven Psychopaths (2012) and Three Billboards Outside Ebbing, Missouri (2017). For the latter, Cornish won her first Screen Actors Guild Award as part of the cast. In 2018, she portrayed Cathy Mueller in the first season of Amazon Video series Jack Ryan opposite John Krasinski. She also played Dixy in the film The Virtuoso (2021) alongside Anthony Hopkins.

Early life 
Abbie Cornish was born on 7 August 1982 in Lochinvar, New South Wales, as the second of five children of Shelley and Barry Cornish. Her sister, Isabelle Cornish, is also an actress. She grew up on a  farm before moving to Newcastle. As a teenager, Cornish was fascinated by independent and foreign films.

Acting career 

Cornish began modelling at age 13 after reaching the finals of a Dolly Magazine competition. In 1999, Cornish was awarded the Australian Film Institute Young Actor's Award for her role in the Australian Broadcasting Corporation's television show Wildside and was offered her first role in a feature film, The Monkey's Mask.

From 2001 to 2003, Cornish played Penne in Life Support, a satirical, sometimes dark look at Australian life as seen through the omnipresent lens of a television lifestyle show.

In 2004, Cornish appeared in the award-winning short film Everything Goes with Hugo Weaving. She received the Australian Film Institute Award for Best Actress in a Leading Role, Best Actress at the FCCA and Inside Film Awards and Best Breakthrough Performance at the 2005 Miami International Film Festival for her role in Somersault. Cornish received critical acclaim for her role in Candy, opposite Heath Ledger. She has also starred in A Good Year, Elizabeth: The Golden Age and Kimberly Peirce's  Stop-Loss. She garnered widespread acclaim for her starring performance as Fanny Brawne in Jane Campion's 2009 film about the Romantic poet John Keats, Bright Star. In April 2010, Cornish was cast in Limitless, the film adaptation of the novel The Dark Fields, directed by Neil Burger and also starring Bradley Cooper and Robert De Niro.

Cornish narrated Zack Snyder's film Sucker Punch, in which she played one of the protagonists.

Cornish played the role of Wally in Madonna's film W.E., about Edward VIII and Wallis Simpson. In 2012, she replaced Emily Blunt in the independent film The Girl, which premiered at the Tribeca Film Festival, and starred alongside Woody Harrelson and Colin Farrell in the crime comedy Seven Psychopaths. Cornish co-starred in the 2014 RoboCop reboot, as Clara Murphy, the wife of protagonist Alex Murphy (Joel Kinnaman).

In 2015, she played Agent Katherine Cowles in Solace, a mystery thriller film directed by Afonso Poyart with central performances by Anthony Hopkins, Colin Farrell, and Jeffrey Dean Morgan.

In 2016, she filmed The Girl Who Invented Kissing with Luke Wilson.

In 2017, she played Agent Sarah Wilson in the science fiction disaster film Geostorm, directed, co-written, and co-produced by Dean Devlin, also starring Gerard Butler, Jim Sturgess, Ed Harris, and Andy García.

In 2018, she starred in Tom Clancy's Jack Ryan as Cathy Mueller, alongside John Krasinski.

In 2019, she starred in the Australian television miniseries Secret Bridesmaids' Business along with Katie McGrath and Georgina Haig.

In 2021, she starred in Dakota with Tim Rozon, "Lola Sultan", Patrick Muldoon and William Baldwin for director Kirk Harris.

Music career 
Cornish is a rapper, singer and songwriter. She has been rapping under the name MC Dusk since 2000 and was part of Australian hip hop group Blades from the age of 18 to 22. In 2015, Cornish supported American rapper Nas on his Australian tour. The same year, she released two new tracks on SoundCloud: "Evolve" featuring Jane Tyrrell and "Way Back Home", which was produced by Suffa from Hilltop Hoods. The songs were re-released in 2020, and her first EP, Key of the Sun, was released in 2021.

Discography
"Evolve" - Single, 2020
"Way Back Home" - Single, 2020
"MVP" - Single, 2020
"Zombies" - Single, 2020
Key of the Sun - EP, 2021
"I'll Be There For You" - Single, 2021

Activism
She is committed to cruelty-free eating, and in 2006, became an ambassador for Australian animal rights group Voiceless, the animal-protection institute, and was part of a national advertising campaign in 2012.

Personal life
Cornish dated actor Ryan Phillippe in 2006, shortly after his separation from actress Reese Witherspoon. They split in 2010.

In 2019, she announced her engagement to mixed martial artist Adel Altamimi.

Filmography

Film

Television

Books 
 Pescan: A Feel Good Cookbook (2019, Abrams Books)

References

Further reading

External links 

 
 

1982 births
20th-century Australian actresses
21st-century Australian actresses
Australian child actresses
Australian expatriate actresses in the United States
Australian expatriate actresses in the United Kingdom
Australian female models
Australian women rappers
Australian film actresses
Australian television actresses
Best Actress AACTA Award winners
Outstanding Performance by a Cast in a Motion Picture Screen Actors Guild Award winners
Living people
People from Maitland, New South Wales